Eltono is a French artist born in the suburbs of Paris in 1975. His work is mostly influenced by his graffiti background. He started painting around 1989 in his neighborhood mostly on train tracks and highway walls. "Eltono focused mainly on the railway lines to the northwest of the city, painting in the traditional silver and black, block letter Parisian style." He lived in Madrid from 1999 to 2010 (where he got his pseudonym), then in Beijing from 2010 to 2014 and since 2014 lives in the south of France. In 1999, while living in Madrid, he started painting abstract symbols with tape and acrylic paint. "It was then that he developed the colorful geometric box patterns for which he is now known." "As Eltono himself suggested, his move away from traditional graffiti was produced so as to find a harmony with both the material and the social body of the city (integrating both its architectonic and societal elements in a more consensual manner)." "Eltono also rejects conventional letterforms in favor of a minimalism device with which to negotiate space."

Eltono's work is mainly influenced by the urban environment and questions the limits between public and private space. He uses the term "public space artist" to describe his practice. When showing his work in galleries and museums, he focuses on finding a coherent way to show street art in private spaces. "[Eltono's] career in both the street and the galleries [], is an example of a certain ethic of sustained work, oblivious to everything, which creates its own parameters and builds its own audience."

He has collaborated with artists such as MOMO (artist), Nuria Mora (http://nuriamora.com/), Luce and is part of Equipo Plástico art collective (alongside Nuria Mora, Nano4814 and Sixeart) and Noviciado9 (alongside 3ttman, Remed, Spok, Nano4814 and Luciano Suarez).

Solo exhibitions (selection) 

 11/2015: Lugares Comunes, Set Espai d’Art, Valencia, Spain
 10/2015: Aléas, Delimbo, Seville, Spain
 06/2015: Incontrôlables, Instituto Cervantes de Paris, Paris, France
 03/2014: Amalgama, Slowtrack, Madrid, Spain
 07/2012: Deambular, Artium Museum, Vitoria, Spain
 06/2012: 1/1, C-Space gallery, Caochangdi, Beijing, China
 10/2011: Eredu, SC Gallery, Bilbao, Spain
 05/2010: Retícula, Delimbo Gallery, Seville, Spain
 01/2009: Coriandoli, Cripta747, Turin, Italy
 01/2009: Pubblico, ROJO®artspace, Milan, Italy
 09/2008: PLAF – Autonomous Mechanisms, New York, U.S.A.
 07/2008: Bermellón, ROJO®artspace, Barcelona, Spain
 06/2008: Astillas, La Culpable, Lima, Peru
 10/2007: Eltono at ART, Monterrey, Mexico
 11/2006: Eigenkunstruktion, Artitude, Berlin, Germany
 01/2006: (x, y, z), Vacío9, Madrid, Spain
 10/2002: Complémentaires, Vacío 9, Madrid, Spain

Collective shows (selection) 

 07/2015: Arqueologia Prohibida, Conde Duque, Madrid, Spain
 04/2015: Oxymores, Ministry of Culture, Paris, France
 01/2015: Mapping The City, Somerset House, London, U.K.
 09/2014: Artmossphere Biennial, Moscow, Russia
 08/2013: Wooster Collective 10th Anniversary Show, Jonathan LeVine Gallery, New York, U.S.A.
 09/2012: Biennale d’Art Contemporain du Havre, Le Havre, France
 02/2010: Murals, Fundación Miró, Barcelona, Spain
 05/2009: Observatori 2009, Valencia, Spain
 05/2008: Street Art, Tate Modern Museum, London, U.K.
 03/2008: Nomadaz, Scion Gallery, Los Angeles, USA
 01/2007: Privé Och Público, Göteborg, Sweden
 09/2006: Pintura Mutante, Marco Museum, Vigo, Spain
 01/2006: 1st Art Biennial Foundation ONCE, Madrid, Spain
 09/2003: Ill Communication, Urbis Museum, Manchester, U.K.
 09/2002: Liverpool Biennial, Liverpool, U.K.
 06/2002: Coded Language, Atlanta, U.S.A.

Notes

Bibliography 

 Ornament & Order: Graffiti, Street Art and the Parergon, Rafael Schacter, Ashgate (U.K.) - 
 The World Atlas of Street Art and Graffiti, Rafael Schacter, Yale University Press (U.S.A.) - 
 Line and Surface, Monographic book, Stickit (N.L.) - 
 Urban Maps, Instruments of Narrative and Interpretation in the City, Richard Brook and Nick Dunn, Ashgate (U.K.) - 
 We Own the Night: The Art of the Underbelly Project, Workhorse and PAC, Rizzoli (U.S.A.) - 
 Trespass, Taschen (U.S.A.) - 
 Durch die Augen in den Sinn, Galerie Konkret (Germany) - 
 Urban Interventions, Personal Projects in Public Spaces, Gestalten (Germany) - 
 Arte Emergente en España – Emerging Art in Spain, Manuela Villa, Vaiven (Spain) - 
 Abstract Graffiti, Cedar Lewisohn, Merrell Publishers - 
 Puerta Lumbreras – Eltono, Documental book about the project, Puerto Lumbreras (Spain)
 Bar Tom Cruise, Monographic book, Ediciones Rojo (Spain) - 
 The Art of Rebellion II (Germany) - 
 Carnet de rue, JR, Free presse (France) - 
 Graffiti World, Thames & Hudson (Germany) - 
 Street Logos, Thames & Hudson (U.K.) - 
 The Art of Rebellion (Germany) -

External links
 Official website: www.eltono.com
 Equipo Plástico website
 Pinto Gratis, Javier Abarca, Urbanario
 Eltono paints mural for French Embassy in Cambodia, Urbanite Webzine
 Does Street Art Belong in a Gallery?, Zachary Kussin, Newsweek
 From dissident to decorative why street art sold out and gentrified our cities, Rafael Schacter, The Conversation
 Esplendor geométrico de Eltono, El Mundo
 El 'spray' se agita en Madrid, El País
 National news in Spain about "Puerta Lumbreras" project, TVE1

Further reading
Interview on Ekosystem in English
Interview on Ekosystem in French
Interview on Ekosystem in Spanish
Interview for Velvetliga

21st-century French artists
Graffiti artists
Street artists
French contemporary artists
Spanish artists
Public art
1975 births
Living people